The men's marathon at the 1904 Summer Olympics in St. Louis, United States, took place on August 30 of that year, over a distance of 24.85 miles (40 km).

The race was run during the hottest part of the day on dusty country roads with minimal water supply; while 32 athletes representing 7 nations (USA, France, Cuba, Greece, South Africa, Great Britain, and Canada) competed, only 14 managed to complete the race, which was a bizarre affair due to poor organization and officiating. While Frederick Lorz was greeted as the apparent winner, he was later disqualified as he had hitched a ride in a car for part of the race. The actual winner, Thomas Hicks, was near collapse and hallucinating by the end of the race, a side effect of being administered brandy, raw eggs, and strychnine by his trainers. The fourth-place finisher, Andarín Carvajal, took a nap during the race after eating spoiled apples.

Background

This was the third appearance of the marathon event, which is one of 12 athletics events to have been held at every Summer Olympics. Arthur L. Newton of the United States was the only runner from 1900 to return, while other significant American runners included the winners of the past three Boston Marathons: 1902 winner Sammy Mellor, 1903 winner John Lordon, and 1904 winner Michael Spring.

Cuba and South Africa each made their first appearance in the event, while the United States was the only nation to have runners in each of the first three Olympic marathons.

The marathon included the first two black Africans to compete in the Olympics: two Tswana men named Len Taunyane and Jan Mashiani, who happened to be in St. Louis as part of the South African exhibit at the 1904 World's Fair. Both had served as long-distance message runners during the then-recent Boer War. Although some accounts report that both ran barefoot, Mashiani was shod in photographs taken during the event.

Competition format
The marathon distance had not yet been standardized; in St. Louis, the course was 24.85 miles (40 km). St. Louis organizers started the marathon at 3 pm, whereas most contemporary marathons start in the early morning to take advantage of cooler times of day. 

The start included five laps around the stadium track; the rest of the course was on dusty country roads, with race officials riding in vehicles ahead of and behind the runners: this created dust clouds that exacerbated the severely hot and humid conditions, with a temperature of around 90 degrees Fahrenheit (32 degrees Celsius) at start time. The course was not cleared of obstacles for the marathon, and the road quality was poor. The runners had to "constantly dodge cross-town traffic, delivery wagons, railroad trains, trolley cars and people walking their dogs." The course eventually ended back in the stadium.

Summary
During the race, John Lordan, who had won the 1903 Boston Marathon, was violently ill after 10 miles and retired, while Sam Mellor, who had won the 1902 Boston Marathon, was also overcome by the dust; despite leading the field at the halfway mark, Mellor dropped out of the race after 16 miles. Another near-fatality during the event was William Garcia of the United States. He was found lying in the road along the marathon course with severe internal injuries caused by breathing the clouds of dust kicked up by the race officials' cars.

The first to arrive at the finish line, after three hours and 13 minutes (more than 13 minutes slower than the winning time in 1900) was Fred Lorz. After being hailed as the winner, he had his photograph taken with Alice Roosevelt, daughter of then-U.S. President Theodore Roosevelt, and was about to be awarded the gold medal when his subterfuge was revealed.

Lorz, suffering cramps, had actually dropped out of the race after nine miles and hitched a ride back to the stadium in a car, waving at spectators and runners alike during the ride. When the car broke down at the 19th mile, he re-entered the race and jogged across the finish line. Upon being confronted by officials, Lorz immediately admitted his deception, and despite his claim that he was joking, the AAU responded by banning him for life; this was later reduced to a year after it was found that he had not intended to defraud. Lorz later won the 1905 Boston Marathon.

Thomas Hicks ended up the winner of the event, although he was aided by measures that would not have been permitted after the late 1960s. Ten miles from the finish, Hicks led the race by a mile and a half, but he had to be restrained from stopping and lying down by his trainers. From then until the end of the race, Hicks received several doses of strychnine (a common rat poison, which stimulates the nervous system in small doses) mixed with brandy and an egg white. He continued to battle onwards, hallucinating, barely able to walk for most of the course. When he reached the stadium, his support team carried him over the line, holding him in the air while he shuffled his feet as if still running. Hicks had to be carried off the track, and might have died in the stadium had he not been treated by several doctors. He lost eight pounds during the course of the marathon.

Cuban postman Andarín Carvajal had also joined the marathon, arriving at the last minute. After losing all of his money gambling in New Orleans, Louisiana, he hitchhiked to St. Louis and had to run the event in street clothes that he cut around the legs to make them into shorts. Not having eaten in 40 hours, he saw a spectator eating 2 peaches. He asked if he could have the peaches, and the spectator declined. He then stole both peaches and ran away. Later, he stopped off in an orchard en route to eat some apples, which turned out to be rotten. The rotten apples caused him to have strong stomach cramps, and he had to lie down and take a nap. Despite falling ill from the apples, and taking a nap, he still managed to finish in fourth place.

Arriving without correct documents, Albert Corey, a French immigrant to the United States, is inconsistently listed as participating in a mixed team in the four mile team race (with four undisputed Americans) and competing for the US in the marathon. The South African entrants, Len Taunyane and Jan Mashiani, finished ninth and twelfth, respectively; this was a disappointment, as many observers were sure Taunyane could have done better if he had not been chased nearly a mile off course by wild dogs.

Dehydration

The only two sources of water for the competitors were a water tower at six miles and a well at about the 12-mile mark. James E. Sullivan was a chief organizer of the Olympics and set up no other water sources along the 24.85-mile course of the marathon even though it was conducted in  heat over unpaved roads choked with dust. His ostensible reason was to conduct research on "purposeful dehydration". The marathon ended with the worst ratio of entrants to finishers (14 of 32) and by far the slowest winning time, 3:28:45, almost 30 minutes slower than the second-slowest winning time.

Schedule

Results

References

Sources
 
 Charles J. P. Lucas, The Olympic Games, 1904. St. Louis, Mo: Woodward & Tieran Printing Co., 1905 (copy from LA84 Foundation library)

External links 

Athletics at the 1904 Summer Olympics
Marathons at the Olympics
Men's marathons
Marathons in the United States